Welcome Back, My Friends, to the Show That Never Ends – Ladies and Gentlemen is the second live album by the English progressive rock band Emerson, Lake & Palmer, released as a triple album in August 1974 on Manticore Records. It was recorded in February 1974 at the Anaheim Convention Center in Anaheim, California, during the group's 1973–74 world tour in support of their fourth studio album, Brain Salad Surgery (1973).

The album was a commercial success, reaching number 4 on the Billboard 200, the band's highest charting album in the US. In the UK, the album peaked at number 6. The album is certified gold by the Recording Industry Association of America (RIAA) for 500,000 copies sold in the US. Following its release, Emerson, Lake & Palmer took an extended break from writing and recording.

Recording 
The album was recorded in February 1974 at the Anaheim Convention Center in Anaheim, California during the group's 1973–74 world tour in support of their fourth studio album, Brain Salad Surgery (1973). Its title comes from the introduction to the show spoken by the show's Master of Ceremonies (UK disc jockey Pete Murray) and the opening line of "Karn Evil 9: First Impression, Part 2".

To record the album, staff and equipment were brought in from Wally Heider Recording in Hollywood, including a 24-track mobile recording and a 40-input mixing console. Peter Granet, one of the engineers, called it "the finest recording experience I've ever had". The band also used a 4-channel quadraphonic PA system on the tour. A quad mix of the album was released as a three 8-track tape set; a quad LP record edition was planned for release in the Quadradisc format, but was scrapped due to engineering issues in mastering, which prevented JVC, the manufacturer, from cutting a stable master to meet the format's specifications.

Most of the recordings on the album were first used for broadcast on the American rock music radio show, The King Biscuit Flower Hour. In 1999, these radio recordings were released on CD.

Reception

AllMusic gave the album a mixed retrospective review, saying that it "makes one realise how accomplished these musicians were, and how well they worked together when the going was good." They praised the set for including all but one song from Brain Salad Surgery, and particularly commended the performance of "Karn Evil 9" as being far superior to the studio rendition. However, they noted that unlike most live albums of the era, Welcome Back did not incorporate studio overdubs, limiting the band's ability to recreate moments from their albums and resulting in poor sound quality: "Even the most recent remastered editions could not fix the feedback, the occasionally leakages, the echo, the seeming distance – the listener often gets the impression of being seated in the upper mezzanine of an arena."

Track listing

Original vinyl release

CD reissue

Personnel
Emerson, Lake & Palmer
Keith Emerson – keyboards
Greg Lake – bass, guitars, vocals, production
Carl Palmer – drums, percussion

Technical Personnel
Andy Hendriksen – engineer
Peter Granet – engineer
Michael Ross – package concept and design
Carl Dun – photography

Charts

Certifications

References

Albums produced by Greg Lake
Emerson, Lake & Palmer live albums
1974 live albums
Rhino Records albums
Manticore Records albums